David Joel King (born May 19, 1963) is a former American football defensive back who played two seasons in the National Football League with the San Diego Chargers and Green Bay Packers. He was drafted by the San Diego Chargers in the tenth round of the 1985 NFL Draft. He played college football at Auburn University on the 1983 National Championship team, and attended Fairhope High School in Fairhope, Alabama.

References

External links
Just Sports Stats
College stats

Living people
1963 births
Players of American football from Alabama
American football defensive backs
Auburn Tigers football players
San Diego Chargers players
Green Bay Packers players
People from Fairhope, Alabama
Sportspeople from Mobile, Alabama